B’nai Sholom Temple is a synagogue in Quincy, Illinois.  It was built in 1870 in the Moorish Revival style.

The original, 80 foot high, twin minaret-style towers were damaged by a tornado in 1947 and not replaced.

The B’nai Sholom Congregation in Quincy dates from 1852.

See also

Oldest synagogues in the United States

References

External links
 Jewish Life in Quincy in the Nineteenth Century (shows lost minarets)
 B'nai Sholom Temple website

Moorish Revival synagogues
Buildings and structures in Quincy, Illinois
Religious organizations established in 1852
Reform synagogues in Illinois
Moorish Revival architecture in Illinois
1852 establishments in Illinois